The University of Central Florida is a space-grant metropolitan public research university located on a  main campus in Orlando, Florida, United States. UCF is a member institution of the State University System of Florida and is the second-largest university in the United States.

UCF consists of a 59,770 member student body and employs more than 10,000 people, including over 1,900 teaching faculty and adjuncts. University of Central Florida faculty and administrators include those who are currently serving and have formerly served the university as professors, deans, administrative officials, or in other notable educational capacities.

Administration

 Steven Altman, former President of the University of Central Florida (1989–1991), current President of the NewSchool of Architecture and Design
 Robert A. Bryan, former Interim President of the University of Central Florida (1991–1992)
 Trevor Colbourn, former President of the University of Central Florida (1978–1989)
 John C. Hitt, former President of the University of Central Florida (1992–2018)
 Charles Millican, former President of the University of Central Florida (1965–1978)
 Todd Stansbury, current University of Central Florida Vice President and Director of Athletics
 Tony Waldrop, former University of Central Florida Provost and Executive Vice President
 Dale Whittaker, former President of the University of Central Florida (2018–2019)
Alexander N. Cartwright, current President of the University of Central Florida (2020-present)

Trustees

 Jim Atchison, current charter member of the University of Central Florida Board of Trustees, current President and Chief Executive Officer of SeaWorld Parks & Entertainment
 Olga Calvet, current Vice Chair of the University of Central Florida Board of Trustees
 Ida Cook, current charter member of the University of Central Florida Board of Trustees
 Meg Crofton, current charter member of the University of Central Florida Board of Trustees, current President of Walt Disney World Resort
 Richard Crotty, current charter member of the University of Central Florida Board of Trustees, former Mayor of Orange County, Florida
 Alan Florez, current charter member of the University of Central Florida Board of Trustees
 Robert Garvy, current charter member of the University of Central Florida Board of Trustees
 Ray Gilley, current charter member of the University of Central Florida Board of Trustees
 Michael Grindstaff, Chairman of the University of Central Florida Board of Trustees and of the UCF Foundation, Inc.
 Marcos Marchena, current charter member of the University of Central Florida Board of Trustees, Vice Chair of the UCF Foundation, Inc.
 Harris Rosen, current charter member of the University of Central Florida Board of Trustees, current President and Chief Executive Officer of Rosen Hotels & Resorts
 John Sprouls, current charter member of the University of Central Florida Board of Trustees, current Chief Executive Officer of Universal Orlando and Executive Vice President of Universal Parks & Resorts
 Daniel Webster, former charter member of the University of Central Florida Board of Trustees, Current United States Representative from Florida
 Al Weiss, former charter member of the University of Central Florida Board of Trustees, former President of Worldwide Operations for Walt Disney Parks and Resorts
 Melissa Westbrook, current charter member of the University of Central Florida Board of Trustees, current President of the UCF Student Government Association
 Manoj Chopra, former member of the University of Central Florida Board of Trustees and Chair of the UCF Faculty Senate, 2005–2009.

Deans
 C. Ross Hinkle, current Dean of the University of Central Florida College of Graduate Studies
 José Fernández, former Dean of the University of Central Florida College of Arts and Humanities
 Michael Frumkin, current Dean of the University of Central Florida College of Health and Public Affairs
Deborah C. German, current Dean of the University of Central Florida College of Medicine
 Paul Jarley, current Dean of the University of Central Florida College of Business Administration
 Michael Johnson, current Dean of the University of Central Florida College of Sciences
 Jean D’Meza Leuner, current Dean of the University of Central Florida College of Nursing
 Abraham Pizam, current Dean of the Rosen College of Hospitality Management
Sandra L. Robinson, current Dean of the University of Central Florida College of Education and Human Performance
 Bahaa E. A. Saleh, current Dean of the University of Central Florida College of Optics and Photonics
Michael Georgiopoulos, current Dean of the University of Central Florida College of Engineering and Computer Science
 Eric Van Stryland, former Dean of the University of Central Florida College of Optics and Photonics, co-developer of the Z-scan technique, Fellow of the Optical Society of America, SPIE and American Physical Society
 Alvin Y. Wang, former Dean of The Burnett Honors College

Professors and faculty
 James H. Ammons, current President of Florida A&M University
 Arlen F. Chase, archaeologist and Chair of the Department of Archaeology at UCF
 Muhammad bin Fahd Al Saud, Prince Mohammad Bin Fahd Program for Research and Strategic Studies was established at the University of Central Florida.
 Robert Denhardt, current Regent Professor at Arizona State University, Fulbright Scholar and former President of the American Society for Public Administration
 Narsingh Deo, former Chair of the Department of Computer Science, Director of the Center for Parallel Computation
 Harriet Elam-Thomas, former United States Ambassador to Senegal
 Howard Eves, mathematician and author of Mathematical Circles series
 Yanga R. Fernández, astronomer and  co-discoverer the Carme group
 Tyler Fisher, Rhodes Scholar, author, and translator
 Louis Frey, Jr., former United States Representative from Florida, founder of the Lou Frey Institute of Politics and Government
 Stuart Fullerton, entomologist, founder of the "Bug Closet" at the University of Central Florida
 Ken Hanson, Judaic studies scholar, expert on the Dead Sea Scrolls and Kabbalah
 Ulric Haynes, former United States Ambassador to Algeria
 Susan Hubbard, author, winner of the Janet Heidinger Kafka Prize
 Stephen Jepson, pottery expert and videographer, founder of the World Pottery Institute
 Dan Jones, English studies scholar, specialist in technical communication
 Anne B. Kerr, current President of Florida Southern College and former assistant dean at UCF
 J. Peter Kincaid, scientist who developed the Flesch–Kincaid readability test for the U.S. Navy, and was the founding director of the Modeling and Simulation doctorate program at UCF
 Emilee Klein, former professional golfer and former head golf coach at UCF
 Mark Koltko-Rivera, Fellow of the American Psychological Association
 Richard Lapchick, current Director of the DeVos Sport Business Management Program and The Institute for Diversity and Ethics in Sport; nationally known human rights activist and sports scholar
 Gary T. Leavens, scholar on behavioral interface specification languages (BISLs) and JML
 John A. List, current Professor of Economics at the University of Chicago
 Charles Negy, professor of psychology
 Ron Logan, former Executive Vice President of Walt Disney Creative Entertainment
 Peter Telep, author and screenwriter
 Ahmed I. Zayed, mathematician and current Chair of the Department of Mathematical Sciences at DePaul University

See also
 University of Central Florida
 List of University of Central Florida Alumni

References

External links
UCF Alumni Association
University of Central Florida

Faculty and administrators
Lists of people by university or college in Florida